Yasemin Kimyacıoğlu (born February 26, 1985), a 5' 7" guard, is a Turkish American women's basketball player at Santa Clara University in California, USA. Her sister, Şebnem Kimyacıoğlu, plays professionally for Turkish club Beşiktaş J.K., and for the Turkish national team. Kimyacıoğlu is a Pinewood High School alum having graduated in 2003, two years after her sister. She was born to Turkish parents in Mountain View, California. She is majoring in mechanical engineering at Santa Clara.

Stanford  statistics
Source

See also
 Turkish women in sports

References

External links
 Yasemin's Statistics

1985 births
Living people
American women's basketball players
Basketball players from California
People from Mountain View, California
American people of Turkish descent
Santa Clara University alumni
Shooting guards
21st-century American women